St. Xavier's School is a co-ed Christian school in Jamnagar, in the Jamnagar district of Gujarat (India). It offers courses from Kindergarten to Higher Secondary divisions and enrolls approximately 2,300 students. The school was founded in 1955 by the Fathers of the Society of Jesus; the first class had only 30 students. It is nowadays run by the CMI fathers.

See also

 List of schools in Gujarat
 Violence against Christians in India

References

Educational institutions established in 1955
High schools and secondary schools in Gujarat
Christian schools in Gujarat
Defunct Jesuit schools
Education in Jamnagar
1955 establishments in Bombay State
Catholic elementary and primary schools in India
Catholic secondary schools in India